"Here, My Dear" is a song written, composed and produced by American soul singer Marvin Gaye, issued on the album of the same name in 1978. The song was a sort of introduction to the deeply confessional and post-divorce concept that gave a chronological look back at the tempestuous marriage between Marvin and first wife Anna. The lyric, You don't have the right to use a son of mine to keep me in line, became a memorable lyric for fans of Gaye and very much was a lyric attacking Anna for demanding alimony and child support payments to support then-twelve-year-old Marvin, III. Marvin then sarcastically told his wife that he dedicated the album to her but warned that she might "not be happy" and telling Anna "this is what you wanted" making a reference to the judge in their divorce case to give up royalties from this album to Anna. The song's musical background would be used for the song "Everybody Needs Love" from this album.

Personnel
All vocals, keyboards and synthesizers by Marvin Gaye
Drums by Bugsy Wilcox
Guitar by Wali Ali
Bass by Frank Blair
Guitar by Gordon Banks

1978 songs
Marvin Gaye songs
Songs written by Marvin Gaye
Song recordings produced by Marvin Gaye